Robert Moroney (23 January 1885 – 4 August 1958) was an Australian cricketer. He played in one first-class match for South Australia in 1920/21.

See also
 List of South Australian representative cricketers

References

External links
 

1885 births
1958 deaths
Australian cricketers
South Australia cricketers
Cricketers from Adelaide